The Barristers (Qualification for Office) Act 1961 (1961 c. 44) was an Act of the Parliament of the United Kingdom that modified the requirements for a barristers call to the Bar. It consisted of only two sections, one of which is the Act's short title. The Act allows time spent as a solicitor to be taken into account when calculating any required period of service for promotion to a role in, for example, the judiciary. The Act was moved as a private members bill and given its second reading by Lord Mancroft, who personally felt that it would have little effect. It was, however, seen as a sign that the two branches of the English legal profession were moving closer to fusion, and allowed solicitors to take up judicial offices previously closed to them.

The Act was repealed by the Courts and Legal Services Act 1990.

References

Bibliography

United Kingdom Acts of Parliament 1961
Repealed United Kingdom Acts of Parliament